The Shanghai–Kowloon through train was an intercity railway service between Hung Hom station in Kowloon, Hong Kong and Shanghai railway station in China, jointly operated by the MTR Corporation Limited of Hong Kong and China's national rail service (Shanghai Railway Bureau). The numbers of this train service were Z99B (away from Shanghai) and Z100B (towards Shanghai). Services operated along the East Rail line in Hong Kong, crossing the boundary between Hong Kong and Mainland China at Lo Wu/Luohu and then continuing along China's railway network via the Guangshen railway, Jingguang railway and the Hukun railway to Shanghai. The train ran every other day. The journey time was approximately 20 hours.

The stops on the route were Guangzhou East, Zhuzhou, and Jinhuaxi stations. Only passengers taking Z99A/Z100A (Shanghai-Guangzhou East) could disembark at these stops.

Since 1 October 2003, passengers could not disembark at the stops listed above, as all travellers to Hong Kong from Shanghai clear Chinese immigration and customs at Shanghai station, and once they had done so they were considered to have left Mainland China and were no longer permitted to leave the train until their arrival at Hung Hom station. The same rule also applied to northbound travellers who would clear Chinese immigration once they had arrived at Shanghai station. 144-hour visa-free transit for passengers who were of selected nationalities were available since 30 January 2016.

Due to the COVID-19 pandemic, the service has been suspended indefinitely since 30 January 2020. There has been no plan to resume its service.

Train carriages
Shanghai–Kowloon through train used 25T class train carriages. The train had 18 carriages in total. But only 11 carriages went to Hong Kong because the other 7 carriages served Z99A/Z100A, they were decoupled (for Z99B to go to Hong Kong) at the Guangzhou East railway station.

Timetable

See also
 Shanghai Railway Bureau
 MTR
 Shanghai–Hangzhou high-speed railway
 Hangzhou–Fuzhou–Shenzhen railway 
 Beijing–Kowloon through train

References

External links 
MTRC intercity passenger services

Passenger rail transport in Hong Kong
Rail transport in Shanghai
MTR
Z
Articles containing video clips